Giovanni Domenico Cappellino (1580–1651) was an Italian painter of the Renaissance period, active mainly in his natal city of Genoa. He was the pupil of the painter Giovanni Battista Paggi. At age 22, he painted a Saint Sebastian for the church of Santa Sabina. He contributed a canvas to the Oratory of San Giacomo della Marina. In Genoa, he painted a Death of St. Francis for the church of San Niccolo, and a St. Francesca Romana for the church of San Stefano.

References

1580 births
1651 deaths
16th-century Italian painters
Italian male painters
17th-century Italian painters
Italian Baroque painters
Painters from Genoa